The 1908 FA Cup final was contested by Wolverhampton Wanderers and Newcastle United at Crystal Palace Park. Newcastle had just finished fourth in the First Division during this season, after winning the league in 1906–07.  This was their third FA Cup final appearance in four years (although they had yet to win). Their 6–0 thrashing of Fulham in the semi-final is a record win for a semi-final. By contrast, Wolves had finished ninth in the Second Division.

Nevertheless, Wolves upset the odds by winning the match 3–1, with goals by Kenneth Hunt, George Hedley and Billy Harrison. James Howey scored the Magpies' reply. The Lord Mayor of London, Sir John Bell, then handed the trophy to Wolves' Billy Wooldridge.

Match summary
Newcastle began the more composed side and launched several early attacks. They had the majority of the possession, but Wolves managed to stand resolute. On the 40-minute mark, a hurried clearance from a scramble in the Newcastle penalty area fell to Kenneth Hunt, who hit the ball back ferociously from distance, which Lawrence in the Magpies' goal could only help into the net. This was the first goal Hunt had ever scored for the club. Wolves grew in confidence with this strike and George Hedley quickly doubled their advantage with swift shot into the far corner after eluding two tackles.

James Howie gave Newcastle hope as he scored after a corner in the 73rd minute, their first Cup Final goal in three attempts, and they pushed for the equaliser. However, Wolves managed to break away and winger Billy Harrison sealed the victory to clinch the cup for a second time for the Molineux men.

Match details

Road to the final

References

External links
Match report
Match report on IFFHS website

1908
1908 in association football
FA Cup
Wolverhampton Wanderers F.C. matches
Newcastle United F.C. matches
April 1908 sports events
1908 sports events in London